Never Let the Bastards Wear You Down is a studio album by American singer Dee Snider released on August 22, 2000. The album title is a reference to the mock-Latin aphorism Illegitimi non-carborundum.

The album contains a number of songs Snider wrote for Twisted Sister, Desperado and Widowmaker, but never recorded. Speaking of Never Let the Bastards Wear You Down, Snider told the Hartford Courant in 2000: "I was approached by Koch Records. They asked me if there was something I wanted to do. And there were a number of songs I've written for various projects that I never had a chance to record." At the time of the album's release, Snider stated it would be his final album in favour of focusing on his film and radio careers. He told the Philadelphia Daily News: "I am definitely of the mind to put my music career behind me. I see this record as the last chapter in my recording career."

Critical reception

Upon its release, Steve Huey of AllMusic described the album as "simple, anthemic '80s pop-metal" and added: "Of course, that was always what Snider did best, and that's why Never Let the Bastards Wear You Down will be a fun listen for anyone who still enjoys vintage Twisted Sister records." David Gerard of The Boston Globe wrote: "On Snider's solo outing, he goes beyond the sometimes poppish overtones of his former band, and instead delves into the more aggressive side of metal. As Snider has claimed this disc to be his last, I can think of no better requiem for the godfather of headbanger rock."

Track listing

Personnel
 Dee Snider – lead vocals, backing vocals
 Tony Palmucci, Dan McCafferty – guitars
 Derek Tailer – bass
 A.J. Pero – Drums

Production
 Denny McNerney – producer, engineer, mastering
 Justin Picotte – assistant engineer

Other
 J Cooch Lucchese – art design, photography
 Pete Scifo, Cris Lepurage, Larry Morano – photography

References

2000 debut albums
Dee Snider albums